Doble Opuesto (Spanish: "Double Opposite") is the second album of the Chilean rock band La Ley and the first commercially successful one after their debut album, Desiertos, failed to sell. The album was released in October 1991 under the production of Jorge Melibosky. Band members for this record were Andrés Bobe (guitars), Mauricio Clavería (drums), Alberto Cuevas (vocals) and Luciano Rojas (bass). Bobe provides vocals for the song "En Lugares".

The disc includes hits like "Doble Opuesto", "Desiertos", "Prisioneros de la Piel" and a cover of The Rolling Stones' #1 single "Angie".

Track listing

Personnel
Andrés Bobe – guitar, keyboards
Mauricio Clavería – drums
Alberto "Beto" Cuevas – vocals
Luciano Rojas – bass
Jorge Melibosky – producer
Shia Arbulu – credits on track 7
Ivan Delgado – credits on Tracks 3,4,5,10
Rodrigo Aboitiz - credits on Tracks 4,5,6,10

References

1991 albums
La Ley (band) albums